The White Oak Creek Covered Bridge, near Alvaton, Georgia, was built in 1880.  It was listed on the National Register of Historic Places in 1973.

It was a c.1880 work, probably of Horace King, a former slave born in 1807.  It is a Long-truss covered bridge.

It is located southeast of Alvaton on Covered Bridge Rd.  It burned down in 1985.  Only metal pilings and a skeleton of the deck remain.

References

Covered bridges in Georgia (U.S. state)
National Register of Historic Places in Meriwether County, Georgia
Bridges completed in 1880